This is a list of lighthouses in Wales. The list runs anticlockwise from north-east to south-east Wales.


Active lighthouses
In this table, the 'focal height' is the height of the light above water level whilst 'nmi' signifies nautical miles.

Inactive lighthouses

See also
List of lighthouses and lightvessels
List of lighthouses in England
List of lighthouses in Scotland
List of lighthouses in the Isle of Man
List of lighthouses in Ireland

References

External links 

Royal Commission on the Ancient and Historical Monuments of Wales in English and Welsh

 
Wales
Lighthouses
Lighthouses